Alfred Paul Ries (November 14, 1926 – October 7, 2022) was an American marketing professional and author. He was the cofounder and chairman of the Atlanta-based consulting firm Ries & Ries with his partner and daughter, Laura Ries. Along with Jack Trout, Ries is credited with resurrecting the idea of "positioning" in the field of marketing.

Life and career
Born in Indianapolis, Indiana in 1926, Ries graduated from DePauw University as a mathematics major in 1950. He accepted a position with the advertising department of General Electric before founding his own advertising agency in New York City, Ries Cappiello Colwell, in 1961. Jack Trout joined the agency in 1967. Ries and Trout wrote a three-part series of articles for Advertising Age in 1972. The themes discussed in that series of articles inspired their later book, Positioning: The Battle for Your Mind, published in 1981. Ries wrote an article for AdWeek that centered around the historical failure of converged devices, Why the iPhone will fail, published in 2007.

The American Marketing Association, NY Chapter announced Ries as one of the 2016 inductees to the Marketing Hall of Fame.

Ries died in Atlanta, Georgia on October 7, 2022, at the age of 95.

Books

References

External links
 
 IMNO Open Source Mentoring Interview with Al Ries
 Q&A featuring Al Ries

1926 births
2022 deaths
Marketing theorists
Marketing people
American marketing people
Advertising theorists
Branding theorists
DePauw University alumni
Businesspeople from Indianapolis
Writers from Indianapolis